"In Love and I Hate It" is a song by British-Norwegian boyband A1, released as the third single from their fourth studio album, Waiting for Daylight.

Background
After taking a period of time out to record following the release of their Eurovision-penned release Don't Wanna Lose You Again, the band recorded a number of songs for their upcoming fourth studio album, Waiting for Daylight. On a post made on the group's official Facebook page, they claimed the intention of originally releasing "Waiting for Daylight", the album's title track, as the third single, however, at the last minute, opting to release "In Love and I Hate It" instead. The band also claimed the song was recorded with an acoustic arrangement, however, the final version features a more computerised musical beat. After the song surfaced on many filesharing websites, the band made the decision to officially release the song via digital download. The song was made available on the iTunes Store from 4 August 2010. On 10 August 2010, the single peaked at No. 13 on the Norwegian Singles Chart. The band ran a competition through their official website in which 100 lucky recipients would win a physical copy of the single, hand-signed by each member of the group. The physical single was never commercially released. The single features the original acoustic demo of the song, as mentioned in the post, as a B-side.

Music video
The music video for "In Love and I Hate It" features footage from a performance of the song at a Norwegian music festival in June 2010. The video also features English-language subtitles, but notably, misses the first line of the song due to a technical error. The video premiered on Norwegian music channels in July 2011, and was uploaded to YouTube by an amateur user on 7 August 2010. The video has a total length of three minutes and thirty-two seconds. The video has been broadcast by UK TV channel The Vault.

Track listing
 Digital download
 "In Love and I Hate It" - 3:36
 "Don't Wanna Lose You Again" (Original acoustic demo) - 3:47
 "Good Things, Bad People" (Original acoustic demo) - 3:05
 "Caught in the Middle" (Unmastered Production demo) - 3:19

 CD single
 "In Love and I Hate It" - 3:36
 "In Love and I Hate It" (Original acoustic demo) - 3:48

Chart positions

References

2010 singles
A1 (band) songs
Songs written by Ben Adams
Songs written by Christian Ingebrigtsen
Songs written by Mark Read (singer)
2010 songs
Songs written by Martin Sjølie
Universal Music Group singles